Škugor is a Croatian surname.

It is one of the most common surnames in the Šibenik-Knin County of Croatia.

It may refer to:

 Franko Škugor, Croatian tennis player

References

Croatian surnames
Slavic-language surnames